John Lawrence Rawlinson (born 4 August 1959) is an English artist and former first-class cricketer.

Rawlinson was born at Edgware in August 1959. He was educated at Eton College, before going up to University College, Oxford. While studying at Oxford, he played first-class cricket for Oxford University in 1979 and 1980, making nine appearances. He scored 112 runs in his nine matches, at an average of 8.00 and a high score of 19. 

After graduating from Oxford, he completed a postgraduate degree at the University of Bristol. He has held a number of jobs after completing his studies, including as a banker and a teacher, before training to become an artist at the Cheltenham School of Fine Art. His brother Harry and son Hugo have both played first-class cricket.

References

External links

1959 births
Living people
People from Edgware
People educated at Eton College
Alumni of University College, Oxford
English cricketers
Oxford University cricketers
Alumni of the University of Bristol
English bankers
English schoolteachers
Artists from London